Jessie Olive Thatcher Bost (December 16, 1875 – February 14, 1963) She was the first female graduate of Oklahoma State University. Bost was born in Guthrie Center, Iowa,  Her family moved to Stillwater in 1891, then part of Oklahoma Territory, and she enrolled in a university, then known as Oklahoma Agricultural and Mechanical (A&M) College, when it opened later that year. She graduated in 1897, alongside two male students in the university's second graduating class. After graduation, Bost worked as a public school teacher in Stillwater. Bost remained involved with the university and became the first president of its Alumni Association in 1902 and the Half-Century Club in 1954. The university named its first female dormitory "Jessie Thatcher Hall for Bost when it opened in 1925.

Marriage and family
Jessie married Henry A. Bost, a fellow student, on July 16, 1902. They continued to live in Stillwater until 1907.   Meanwhile, the couple had four children and moved to Alva in 1908. As soon as she settled in Alva, she organized a Parent-Teachers Association (PTA) and was elected chairman of the Northwest PTA.

Jessie Bost interrupted her career in education and spent full time raising children. She and Henry had two sons, Armon Henry (1909-2004) and William Rufus (1916-1944).

Bost was inducted into the Oklahoma Women's Hall of Fame in 1997.

Notes

References

External links
Jessie Thatcher Bost Collection at Oklahoma State University

1875 births
1963 deaths
People from Stillwater, Oklahoma
People from Guthrie Center, Iowa
People from Alva, Oklahoma
Oklahoma State University alumni
Educators from Oklahoma
American women educators